The Morro dos Seis Lagos Biological Reserve is a biological reserve in the state of Amazonas, Brazil.
It protects an inselberg in the Amazon rainforest that contains valuable minerals.
Mining has been prohibited since the reserve protected, and since it is in an indigenous territory.

Location

The Morro dos Seis Lagos (Hill of the Six Lakes) Biological Reserve is in the municipality of São Gabriel da Cachoeira, Amazonas.
The reserve lies within the Balaio Indigenous Territory.
It is surrounded by the Pico da Neblina National Park.
Highway BR-307 runs through the reserve, connecting the town of São Gabriel da Cachoeira to Cucuí on the Rio Negro near the point where the river enters Brazil.
The reserve is accessible by boat via the Igarapé-Mirim.

The hill is an inselberg that may be the remains of a longer pediplain.
The reserve is drained by streams of the Rio Negro basin, which form waterfalls.
It contains six lakes, from which it takes its name, with different colors due to dissolved minerals.
It contains caves and collapsed rock structures.
There is high potential for development of ecotourism.

History

The region contains large mineral reserves, including rich deposits of iron, manganese and niobium.
The latter are important for manufacture of electronic devices such as computers and cellphones.
The Companhia de Pesquisas e Recursos Minerais (CPRM) claimed the mineral rights based on a concession and explorations that started in 1975.
The CPRM is owned by the Ministry of Mines and Energy.
The 1988 constitution only allows mining on indigenous territories when authorized by a specific law.
The Indians expressed opposition to mining.

The Morro dos Seis Lagos Biological Reserve was created by Amazonas state decree 12.836 of 9 March 1990.
In October 1997 a scheduled auction of the niobium reserve was cancelled due to pressure from the Brazilian Institute of Environment and Renewable Natural Resources, which objected to opening the mine since it is within two protected areas.
In 1999 the mining concession was annulled at the request of the Public Ministry of the State of Amazonas.

Environment

Vegetation is typical of rupestrian, submontane and montane regions.
Vegetation is in the contact between campinarana and rainforest.
Fauna include jaguar (Panthera onca), ocelot (Leopardus pardalis) and screaming piha (Lipaugus vociferans). 
Visits are allowed only for research or education.

Notes

Sources

 

Biological reserves of Brazil
Protected areas established in 1990
1990 establishments in Brazil
Protected areas of Amazonas (Brazilian state)